Carphina elliptica is a species of longhorn beetles of the subfamily Lamiinae. It was described by Ernst Friedrich Germar in 1824 and is known from southeastern Brazil.

References

Beetles described in 1824
Carphina